Digrammia equivocata, the equivocal looper, is a species of moth native to North America. It is listed as historic in the US state of Massachusetts, and as a species of special concern in Connecticut. The larval host plant is Tephrosia virginiana. It was described by Douglas C. Ferguson in 2008.

References

Moths of North America
Noctuinae